Restrepia nittiorhyncha is a species of orchid endemic to Colombia.

References

External links 

nittiorhyncha
Endemic orchids of Colombia